Republic of Korea Air Force Academy (ROKAFA, Hangul: 공군사관학교, Hanja: 空軍士官學校) is a Republic of Korea Air Force institution for the undergraduate education and military training of officers. It is located at Cheongju, Chungbuk, South Korea. The current superintendent of the Academy is Lieutenant General Park, Ha Sik.

Seongmudae (Hanja: 星武臺, literally Military Star Base) is another name of the academy.

History 
The Academy was founded as the Aviation Academy at Gimpo in 1949, which later in the same year was renamed into its current name. During the Korean War, the Academy was moved to Mosulpo Base, Jeju and again to Jinhae Base, Gyeongnam. The Academy was given its other name Seongmudae in 1966 by then President Park Chung-hee. In 1985 the Academy was moved to its current base in Cheongju.

ROKAFA became the first of the three Korean military academies to allow female cadets to enter in 1997.

Campus 
The campus is located in the central part of the country at Cheongju.

Organization 
Cadet Wing, Faculty Board and the Base Group are the main divisions along with the Academy Headquarters, Administration Division, and Academic Information Centre.

Education 
Cadets of the Academy do not have to pay any tuition but need to serve at least ten years in the Air Force. It has a number of international exchange cadets such as Japan, Turkey, and Thailand. Since no pilot training is included in the curricula, all the graduates who pass the physical test are supposed to enter the pilot training after graduation.

Cadets are required to select his/her major from several available curricula offered including foreign languages, aeronautical engineering, astronautical engineering, international relations, industrial engineering, computer science, mechanical engineering, electronic engineering, management, Military and Strategic Studies.

See also 
 Republic of Korea military academies
 Korea Military Academy (ROK Army)
 The Naval Academy of Korea (ROK Navy)
 List of national universities in South Korea
 List of universities and colleges in South Korea
 Education in Korea

References

External links 
 Korea Air Force Academy 

1949 establishments in South Korea
Republic of Korea Air Force
Military academies of South Korea
Air force academies
Universities and colleges in North Chungcheong Province
Cheongju
Educational institutions established in 1949